St George St George, 1st Baron Saint George (circa 1715 – 2 January 1775), was an Irish politician.

Born St George Ussher, he was the son of John Ussher by his wife Mary St George, daughter of the 1st Baron St George.

He succeeded his father as Member of Parliament for Carrick in the Irish House of Commons from 1741 until he was raised to the Irish House of Lords. He was created Baron Saint George of Hatley St George, in the Peerage of Ireland, on 19 April 1763; this was a revival of the title held by his grandfather.

He married Elizabeth Dominick, daughter of Sir Christopher Dominick (died 1743), a wealthy Dublin doctor who began the laying out of Dominick Street in Dublin.

He died without surviving male issue, so his title became extinct. His daughter Emilia later married William FitzGerald, 2nd Duke of Leinster. His widow Lady St George died in 1813.

References
 
 
 http://thepeerage.com/p3037.htm#i30363

1710s births
1775 deaths
Barons in the Peerage of Ireland
Peers of Ireland created by George III
Irish MPs 1727–1760
Irish MPs 1761–1768
Members of the Parliament of Ireland (pre-1801) for County Leitrim constituencies